Voices from Beyond is a 1994 Italian horror film by director Lucio Fulci.  The original shooting title of the film was Urla dal profondo. The story centers around the murder of a wealthy man despised by most of his relatives, with his spirit returning from the afterlife to guide his daughter in uncovering the identity of his killer.

Plot

Giorgio Mainardi, a wealthy, middle-aged financier, lies dying in a hospital bed surrounded by his family. He has collapsed suddenly, coughing up blood. His last word is to his stone-faced family is, "Why?" The doctor's diagnosis of Giorgio's death is an internal hemorrhage, possibly from a stomach or intestinal ulcer. The following day, Giorgio's daughter Rosie arrives at the Mainardi estate having taken a leave of absence from her college studies to attend the funeral and for the reading of the will. Rosie soon finds her entire family squabbling over the estate. Giorgio's stepmother Hilda, refuses permission for an autopsy and taunts her elderly husband, Giorgio's father, Paolo, who is near death himself from a recent stroke and is unable to move or speak. Meanwhile, Hilda's son Mario is revealed to be having an affair with Giorgio's third wife, Lucy. Lucy is only a few years older than Rosie and is apparently the only one of the Mainardi family who shows any compassion for her presence.

Giorgio's spirit remains conscious after death, and from his buried coffin, he tries to communicate with Rosie. He succeeds by entering her dreams and implores her to discover who in the family was responsible for his death. However, he tells her to hurry, for as his corpse rots away in the coffin, so does his power to communicate with his daughter. At the funeral, each of the family mourners thinks back to their relationship with the dead man. Lucy remembers his anger at her frigidity; Mario recalls how Giorgio humiliated and insulted him after he asked for financial help in obtaining a business position; Hilda fumes over the memory of Giorgio ordering the bank not to let her cash the checks from his sick father's account; and Rita, Giorgio's mistress, remembers being spurned when Giorgio rudely broke off their secret affair and decided to go back to his wife.

At the reading of the will, bad feelings erupt when it is found that Giorgio has left his entire estate to Rosie. Lucy, however, is allowed to remain at the house. But even she is angry because no provision has been made to their child, David, a little boy whom Giorgio believes was not his.

Despite Hilda's objections, an autopsy on Giorgio goes ahead. The pathologist takes a sample of his small intestines and discovers some lacerations to the interior wall. He puts the piece in a jar of formaldehyde for later inspection. A little later, Rosie and her college boyfriend Gianni discover that the jar containing the organ pieces removed from Giorgio's corpse has been "accidentally" smashed. But Gianni, a medical student with access to the pathology lab, tells Rosie that he'd found tiny splinters of glass in the intestines before the accident occurred later that night. He suggests that they go to the police with their suspicions. Still, Rosie, who is now frequently and telepathically in touch with the spirit of her dead father, insists they investigate themselves rather than attract a public scandal.

Lucy tells Rosie that Giorgio had returned from a visit to his mistress the night of his collapse. Rosie suspects that Rita may have put the mini-glass shards in his food. Lucy talks to the Maitre'd at a local restaurant where Rita and Giorgio visited for their secret dates. But the Maitre'd tells Rosie that the couple had pitched into a furious argument when they arrived over Giorgio wanting to end their clandestine affair. They soon left the restaurant without even drinking a glass of wine. With Rita written off as a suspect, Rosie returns to the house but accidentally discovers that her soda drinks have been poisoned when a mini hypodermic hole is found at the top of one of her soda cans. Rosie talks to Dorie, the housekeeper, and little David's nanny, who says that only she, David, and Lucy were in the house on the night of Giorgio's death. Rosie notices that David is playing with a mortar and pestle. She confronts Lucy, who acts oddly but seems distressed rather than panicked by her stepdaughter's suspicions.

After a significant dream, Rosie wakes up with the answer to the puzzle. The glass shards had been concealed in the ice-cubes Giorgio Mainardi took with his late-night drinks. Rosie confronts Lucy and reveals that Hilda Mainardi and her son Mario must have hatched the plot. Hilda enters and admits the plot to kill Giorgio for his money and slyly adds that Lucy knew about the scheme but did nothing to stop them. In case of discovery, young David had been encouraged to play with the mortar and pestle, grinding up a light bulb into tiny splinters and adding them to the water in the ice-cube tray as a "game." Hilda hoped to explain the murder away as a tragic accident that way. Rosie tells Hilda that she will leave the conspirators to fester in the Mainardi house together instead of informing the police. As she prepares to return to college, Rosie tells Hilda that Giorgio's vengeful spirit will be everywhere, haunting them to the grave. In the film's finale, Rosie is seen at her father's grave, having told him how he died, and the two share a hearty final laugh.

Cast
Duilio Del Prete: Giorgio Mainardi
Karina Huff: Rosie Mainardi
Pascal Persiano: Mario Mainardi
Lorenzo Flaherty: Gianni/ Tommy
Bettina Giovannini: Lucy Mainardi
Frances Nacman: Hilda Mainardi
 Lucio Fulci: Pathologist (cameo)
 Paolo Paoloni: Grandpa Mainardi
 Sacha Maria Darwin:  Dorie the maid
 Antonella Tinazzo: Rita
 Tomasso Felleghy: restaurant manager

Production
The plot for Voices from Beyond was written by Lucio Fulci and Daniele Stroppa, based on a short story Fulci had published in the Gazzetta di Firenze which was later collected in a 1992 anthology of Fulci's short stories titled Le lune nere. Fulci wrote the short story initially with the intention of developing it into a screenplay later. Fulci asked screenwriter Piero Regnoli to work on the screenplay with him.

The film was made in early 1991. When filming, the crew had access to a villa once owned by Luchino Visconti.

The film's end credits added "This film is dedicated to my few real friends, in particular to Clive Barker and Claudio Carabba". Biographer Troy Howarth wrote "Barker's nightmarish visions of hellish horror definitely owe a bit to Fulci's celebrated horror films of the 1980s, of course, while Carabba was one of the few critics in Italy who took Fulci and his work seriously."

Release
Voci dal profondo was released theatrically in Italy on March 1, 1994 at a running time of 89 minutes.

It was later released on home video in the United States and the United Kingdom as Voices from Beyond with a running time of 85 minutes.

Reception
Fulci spoke about the film stating he did "love it very much. It's a wonderful movie with the wrong cast" specifically describing Karina Huff as "unpleasant, Del Prete is completely out of the role, the mother-in-law is too wicked and you understand immediately that she is the killer."

References

Sources

External links

Voices from Beyond at Variety Distribution

Films directed by Lucio Fulci
Films scored by Stelvio Cipriani
1994 films
1994 horror films
Italian horror films